Gastropacha quercifolia, the lappet, is a moth of the family Lasiocampidae.

The wingspan is 50–90 mm. Meyrick describes it thus - forewings with 9 to termen; red-brown, with purple-bluish gloss, towards costa blackish-mixed, dorsally ferruginous; first, second, and praesubterminal lines blackish-grey, waved, bent near costa; a blackish-grey discal mark; termen waved-dentate. Hindwings as forewings, but lines indistinct, straight, costal area ferruginous, with about six blackish pseudoneuria; 8 connected with cell by long bar. Larva dark grey or brown; whitish dorsal marks on 3 and 4; 2nd and 3rd incisions deep indigo-blue; a prominence on 1 2; a subspiracular series of tubercles and fringe of pale hairs. 

The larvae feed on Crataegus, Prunus spinosa, willow and oak.

Subspecies
Gastropacha quercifolia quercifolia (Linnaeus, 1758)
Gastropacha quercifolia mekongensis de Lajonquière, 1976
Gastropacha quercifolia thibetana de Lajonquière, 1976

References

External links

Lappet at UKMoths
Lepiforum.de

Lasiocampidae
Moths described in 1758
Moths of Japan
Moths of Africa
Moths of Europe
Moths of Asia
Taxa named by Carl Linnaeus